Mirante is a municipality in the state of Bahia in Brazil.

Mirante may refer to:

Places
Mirante do Paranapanema, in São Paulo state
Mirante da Serra, in Rondônia state
Mirante do Vale, a skyscraper in São Paulo municipality

People
Antonio Mirante, Italian football player

Other uses
MFM Mirante Fund Management, an independent asset management firm
O Mirante, a weekly regional newspaper